This is a list of topics related to the issue of masculism, men's liberation, the men's movement, and men's rights:

 Airline sex discrimination policy controversy
 Alimony
 Androcentrism 
 Androcracy 
 Antifeminism
 Arranged marriage
 Body shape 
 Boy
 Boys are stupid, throw rocks at them! controversy
 Chauvinism
 Conflict tactics scale
 Dating abuse
 Deadbeat parent
 Discrimination
 Domestic violence
 Domestic violence against men
 Dominator culture
 Double burden
 Economic inequality
 Educational attainment in the United States by Sex
 Egalitarianism
 Equal Rights Amendment
 Estimates of sexual violence
 Factors associated with being a victim of sexual violence
 Warren Farrell
 Fathers' rights movement
 Fathers' rights movement by country
 Fathers' rights movement in Australia
 Fathers' rights movement in Italy
 Fathers' rights movement in the United Kingdom
 Fathers' rights movement in the United States 
 Feminist Sex Wars
 Forced marriage
 Gender archaeology
 Gender binary
 Gender crime
 Gender discrimination
 Gender equality
 Gender history
 Gender identity
 Gender inequality
 Gender mainstreaming
 Gender marking in job titles
 Gender-neutral language
 Gender neutrality in English
 Gender performativity
 Gender role
 Gender roles in Islam
 Gender studies
 Gendercide
 Todd Goldman (David and Goliath clothing)
 Homemaking
 Human male sexuality 
 Human sex ratio
 Income inequality in the United States
 Initiatives to prevent sexual violence
 International Men's Day 
 John school
 Machismo 
 Male bonding 
 Male chauvinism
 Male–female income disparity in the United States
 Male privilege 
 Man
 Marriage of convenience
 Masculinity 
 Masculism 
 Men and feminism 
 Men in nursing 
 Men's health 
 Men's liberation 
 Men's movement 
 Men's rights movement
 Men's rights movement in India 
 Men's shelter 
 Men's studies 
 Misandry 
 Mixed-sex education
 Mythopoetic men's movement
 Objectification
 Occupational segregation
 Occupational sexism
 Paper Abortion
 Paternal bond 
 Paternal rights and abortion
 Paternalism 
 Paternity fraud
 Patriarchy 
 Patrilineality 
 Patrilocal residence 
 Philandry
 Pro-feminism
 Reproductive justice
 Reproductive rights
 Reverse discrimination
 Salic law
 Sex and the law
 Sex differences in crime
 Sex differences in humans
 Sex in advertising
 Sex segregation
 Sexism
 Sexual harassment
 Sexual objectification
 Sexual revolution
 Sexual violence
 Sociology of fatherhood 
 Sociology of gender
 Sperm theft
 Stay-at-home dad 
 Tender years doctrine
 Testosterone poisoning 
 Trophy wife 
 Victorian masculinity
 Virility 
 Womb and vagina envy 
 Women-only passenger car

Society-related lists
Masculism